Paul Greene & the Other Colours is an Australian roots band fronted by Paul Greene. Their album Behind The Stars was nominated for a 2012 ARIA Award for Best Blues & Roots Album. Previously a solo artist Paul Greene now works with a backing band the Other Colours.

Greene is a former athlete. He was a sprinter who competed at the 1996 Olympics. Through the Olympic Record CD project he started working with Rob Hirst and Rick Grossman, joining their band Ghostwriters and working with Hirst on two albums. He also established a solo career, gaining national airplay on Triple J.  Greene also fronts a reformation of Spy vs Spy.

Band members

Members 
 Neil Beaver
 Paul Greene
 Eleanor Plummer

Former members 
 Ellie Plummer
 Matt Sykes

Discography

Albums

Awards and nominations

ARIA Music Awards
The ARIA Music Awards is an annual awards ceremony that recognises excellence, innovation, and achievement across all genres of Australian music. 

|-
| ARIA Music Awards of 2012
| Behind the Stars
| ARIA Award for Best Blues and Roots Album
| 
|-

References

Australian folk music groups